Ampudia is a municipality located in the province of Palencia, Castile and León, Spain. According to the 2004 census (INE), the municipality has a population of 677 inhabitants.

Castle of Ampudia

Ampudia is the location of a Fifteenth-Century castle, now privately owned and open for tours.  The castle was one site of the filming of the 1961 American film El Cid.

References

External links
Información, Historia y Fotografías de Ampudia. 

Municipalities in the Province of Palencia